In mathematics, the surreal number system is a totally ordered proper class containing the real numbers as well as infinite and infinitesimal numbers, respectively larger or smaller in absolute value than any positive real number.  The surreals share many properties with the reals, including the usual arithmetic operations (addition, subtraction, multiplication, and division); as such, they form an ordered field. If formulated in von Neumann–Bernays–Gödel set theory, the surreal numbers are a universal ordered field in the sense that all other ordered fields, such as the rationals, the reals, the rational functions, the Levi-Civita field, the superreal numbers (including the hyperreal numbers) can be realized as subfields of the surreals. The surreals also contain all transfinite ordinal numbers; the arithmetic on them is given by the natural operations. It has also been shown (in von Neumann–Bernays–Gödel set theory) that the maximal class hyperreal field is isomorphic to the maximal class surreal field.

History of the concept 
Research on the Go endgame by John Horton Conway led to the original definition and construction of the surreal numbers.  Conway's construction was introduced in Donald Knuth's 1974 book Surreal Numbers: How Two Ex-Students Turned On to Pure Mathematics and Found Total Happiness. In his book, which takes the form of a dialogue, Knuth coined the term surreal numbers for what Conway had called simply numbers.  Conway later adopted Knuth's term, and used surreals for analyzing games in his 1976 book On Numbers and Games.

A separate route to defining the surreals began in 1907, when Hans Hahn introduced Hahn series as a generalization of formal power series, and Hausdorff introduced certain ordered sets called ηα-sets for ordinals α and asked if it was possible to find a compatible ordered group or field structure. In 1962 Norman Alling used a modified form of Hahn series to construct such ordered fields associated to certain ordinals α, and in 1987 he showed that taking α to be the class of all ordinals in his construction gives a class that is an ordered field isomorphic to the surreal numbers.

If the surreals are considered as 'just' a proper class sized real closed field, Alling's 1962 paper handles the case of strongly inaccessible cardinals which can naturally be considered as proper classes by cutting off the cumulative hierarchy of the universe one stage above the cardinal, and Alling accordingly deserves much credit for the discovery/invention of the surreals in this sense. There is an important additional field structure on the surreals that isn't visible through this lens however, namely the notion of a 'birthday' and the corresponding natural description of the surreals as the result of a cut-filling process along their birthdays given by Conway. This additional structure has become fundamental to a modern understanding of the surreal numbers, and Conway is thus given credit for discovering the surreals as we know them today—Alling himself gives Conway full credit in a 1985 paper preceding his book on the subject.

Description

(Both may hold, in which case a and b are equivalent and denote the same number.) Each number is formed from an ordered pair of subsets of numbers already constructed:  given subsets L and R of numbers such that all the members of L are strictly less than all the members of R, then the pair { L | R } represents a number intermediate in value between all the members of L and all the members of R.

Different subsets may end up defining the same number:  { L | R } and { L′ | R′ } may define the same number even if L ≠ L′ and R ≠ R′. So strictly speaking, the surreal numbers are equivalence classes of representations of form { L | R } that designate the same number.

In the first stage of construction, there are no previously existing numbers so the only representation must use the empty set:  { | }.  This representation, where L and R are both empty, is called 0.  Subsequent stages yield forms like

{ 0 | } = 1

{ 1 | } = 2

{ 2 | } = 3

and

{ | 0 } = −1

{ | −1 } = −2

{ | −2 } = −3

The integers are thus contained within the surreal numbers.  (The above identities are definitions, in the sense that the right-hand side is a name for the left-hand side. That the names are actually appropriate will be evident when the arithmetic operations on surreal numbers are defined, as in the section below). Similarly, representations such as

{ 0 | 1 } = 

{ 0 |  } = 

{  | 1 } = 

arise, so that the dyadic rationals (rational numbers whose denominators are powers of 2) are contained within the surreal numbers.

After an infinite number of stages, infinite subsets become available, so that any real number a can be represented by { La | Ra },
where La is the set of all dyadic rationals less than a and 
Ra is the set of all dyadic rationals greater than a (reminiscent of a Dedekind cut).  Thus the real numbers are also embedded within the surreals.

There are also representations like

{ 0, 1, 2, 3, ... |  } = ω

{ 0 | 1, ... } = ε

where ω is a transfinite number greater than all integers and ε is an infinitesimal greater than 0 but less than any positive real number.  Moreover, the standard arithmetic operations (addition, subtraction, multiplication, and division) can be extended to these non-real numbers in a manner that turns the collection of surreal numbers into an ordered field, so that one can talk about 2ω or ω − 1 and so forth.

Construction

Surreal numbers are constructed inductively as equivalence classes of pairs of sets of surreal numbers, restricted by the condition that each element of the first set is smaller than each element of the second set. The construction consists of three interdependent parts: the construction rule, the comparison rule and the equivalence rule.

Forms
A form is a pair of sets of surreal numbers, called its left set and its right set. A form with left set L and right set R is written { L | R }.  When L and R are given as lists of elements, the braces around them are omitted.

Either or both of the left and right set of a form may be the empty set. The form { { } | { } } with both left and right set empty is also written { | }.

Numeric forms and their equivalence classes

Construction Rule
A form { L | R } is numeric if the intersection of L and R is the empty set and each element of R is greater than every element of L, according to the order relation ≤ given by the comparison rule below.

The numeric forms are placed in equivalence classes; each such equivalence class is a surreal number. The elements of the left and right set of a form are drawn from the universe of the surreal numbers (not of forms, but of their equivalence classes).

Equivalence Rule
 Two numeric forms x and y are forms of the same number (lie in the same equivalence class) if and only if both x ≤ y and y ≤ x.

An ordering relationship must be antisymmetric, i.e., it must have the property that x = y (i. e., x ≤ y and y ≤ x are both true) only when x and y are the same object.  This is not the case for surreal number forms, but is true by construction for surreal numbers (equivalence classes).

The equivalence class containing { | } is labeled 0; in other words, { | } is a form of the surreal number 0.

Order

The recursive definition of surreal numbers is completed by defining comparison:

Given numeric forms x = { XL | XR } and y = { YL | YR }, x ≤ y if and only if both:
There is no xL ∈ XL such that y ≤ xL. That is, every element in the left part of x is strictly smaller than y.
There is no yR ∈ YR such that yR ≤ x. That is, every element in the right part of y is strictly larger than x.
Surreal numbers can be compared to each other (or to numeric forms) by choosing a numeric form from its equivalence class to represent each surreal number.

Induction

This group of definitions is recursive, and requires some form of mathematical induction to define the universe of objects (forms and numbers) that occur in them.  The only surreal numbers reachable via finite induction are the dyadic fractions; a wider universe is reachable given some form of transfinite induction.

Induction rule
 There is a generation S0 = { 0 }, in which 0 consists of the single form { | }.

The base case is actually a special case of the induction rule, with 0 taken as a label for the "least ordinal".  Since there exists no Si with i < 0, the expression  is the empty set; the only subset of the empty set is the empty set, and therefore S0 consists of a single surreal form { | } lying in a single equivalence class 0.

For every finite ordinal number n, Sn is well-ordered by the ordering induced by the comparison rule on the surreal numbers.

The first iteration of the induction rule produces the three numeric forms { | 0 } < { | } < { 0 | } (the form  { 0 | 0 } is non-numeric because 0≤0).  The equivalence class containing { 0 | } is labeled 1 and the equivalence class containing { | 0 } is labeled −1.  These three labels have a special significance in the axioms that define a ring; they are the additive identity (0), the multiplicative identity (1), and the additive inverse of 1 (−1).  The arithmetic operations defined below are consistent with these labels.

For every i < n, since every valid form in Si is also a valid form in Sn, all of the numbers in Si also appear in Sn (as supersets of their representation in Si).  (The set union expression appears in our construction rule, rather than the simpler form Sn−1, so that the definition also makes sense when n is a limit ordinal.)  Numbers in Sn that are a superset of some number in Si are said to have been inherited from generation i.  The smallest value of α for which a given surreal number appears in Sα is called its birthday.  For example, the birthday of 0 is 0, and the birthday of −1 is 1.

A second iteration of the construction rule yields the following ordering of equivalence classes:

 { | −1 } = { | −1, 0 } = { | −1, 1 } = { | −1, 0, 1 }
 < { | 0 } = { | 0, 1 }
 < { −1 | 0 } = { −1 | 0, 1 }
 < { | } = { −1 | } = { | 1 } = { −1 | 1 }
 < { 0 | 1 } = { −1, 0 | 1 }
 < { 0 | } = { −1, 0 | }
 < { 1 | } = { 0, 1 | } = { −1, 1 | } = { −1, 0, 1 | }

Comparison of these equivalence classes is consistent, irrespective of the choice of form.  Three observations follow:
 S2 contains four new surreal numbers.  Two contain extremal forms: { | −1, 0, 1 } contains all numbers from previous generations in its right set, and { −1, 0, 1 | } contains all numbers from previous generations in its left set.  The others have a form that partitions all numbers from previous generations into two non-empty sets.
 Every surreal number x that existed in the previous "generation" exists also in this generation, and includes at least one new form: a partition of all numbers other than x from previous generations into a left set (all numbers less than x) and a right set (all numbers greater than x).
 The equivalence class of a number depends only on the maximal element of its left set and the minimal element of the right set.

The informal interpretations of { 1 | } and { | −1 } are "the number just after 1" and "the number just before −1" respectively; their equivalence classes are labeled 2 and −2.  The informal interpretations of { 0 | 1 } and { −1 | 0 } are "the number halfway between 0 and 1" and "the number halfway between −1 and 0" respectively; their equivalence classes are labeled  and −.  These labels will also be justified by the rules for surreal addition and multiplication below.

The equivalence classes at each stage n of induction may be characterized by their n-complete forms (each containing as many elements as possible of previous generations in its left and right sets).  Either this complete form contains every number from previous generations in its left or right set, in which case this is the first generation in which this number occurs; or it contains all numbers from previous generations but one, in which case it is a new form of this one number.  We retain the labels from the previous generation for these "old" numbers, and write the ordering above using the old and new labels:
 −2 < −1 < − < 0 <  < 1 < 2.

The third observation extends to all surreal numbers with finite left and right sets.  (For infinite left or right sets, this is valid in an altered form, since infinite sets might not contain a maximal or minimal element.)  The number { 1, 2 | 5, 8 } is therefore equivalent to { 2 | 5 }; one can establish that these are forms of 3 by using the birthday property, which is a consequence of the rules above.

Birthday property
A form x = { L | R } occurring in generation n represents a number inherited from an earlier generation i < n if and only if there is some number in Si that is greater than all elements of L and less than all elements of the R.  (In other words, if L and R are already separated by a number created at an earlier stage, then x does not represent a new number but one already constructed.)  If x represents a number from any generation earlier than n, there is a least such generation i, and exactly one number c with this least i as its birthday that lies between L and R;  x is a form of this c. In other words, it lies in the equivalence class in Sn that is a superset of the representation of c in generation i.

Arithmetic

The addition, negation (additive inverse), and multiplication of surreal number forms x = { XL | XR } and y = { YL | YR } are defined by three recursive formulas.

Negation

Negation of a given number x = { XL | XR } is defined by
,
where the negation of a set S of numbers is given by the set of the negated elements of S:
.

This formula involves the negation of the surreal numbers appearing in the left and right sets of x, which is to be understood as the result of choosing a form of the number, evaluating the negation of this form, and taking the equivalence class of the resulting form.  This only makes sense if the result is the same, irrespective of the choice of form of the operand.  This can be proved inductively using the fact that the numbers occurring in XL and XR are drawn from generations earlier than that in which the form x first occurs, and observing the special case:
.

Addition
The definition of addition is also a recursive formula:
 ,
where

.

This formula involves sums of one of the original operands and a surreal number drawn from the left or right set of the other. It can be proved inductively with the special cases:
 0 + 0 = { | } + { | } = { | } = 0
 x + 0 = x + { | } = { XL + 0 | XR + 0 } = { XL | XR } = x
 0 + y = { | } + y = { 0 + YL | 0 + YR } = { YL | YR } = y
For example:
 +  = { 0 | 1 } + { 0 | 1 } = {  |  },
which by the birthday property is a form of 1. This justifies the label used in the previous section.

Multiplication
Multiplication can be defined recursively as well, beginning from the special cases involving 0, the multiplicative identity 1, and its additive inverse -1:

The formula contains arithmetic expressions involving the operands and their left and right sets, such as the expression  that appears in the left set of the product of x and y.

 ⋅  = { 0 | 1 } ⋅ { 0 | 1 } = { 0 |  } = .

Division 
The definition of division is done in terms of the reciprocal and multiplication:

where

for positive y. Only positive yL are permitted in the formula, with any nonpositive terms being ignored (and yR are always positive). For example, if y = 3 = { 2 | }, then we know a left term of  will be 0. This in turn means  =  is a right term. This means

is a left term. This means

will be a right term. Continuing, this gives

For negative y,  is given by

If y = 0, then  is undefined.

Consistency
It can be shown that the definitions of negation, addition and multiplication are consistent, in the sense that:
 Addition and negation are defined recursively in terms of "simpler" addition and negation steps, so that operations on numbers with birthday n will eventually be expressed entirely in terms of operations on numbers with birthdays less than n;
 Multiplication is defined recursively in terms of additions, negations, and "simpler" multiplication steps, so that the product of numbers with birthday n will eventually be expressed entirely in terms of sums and differences of products of numbers with birthdays less than n;
 As long as the operands are well-defined surreal number forms (each element of the left set is less than each element of the right set), the results are again well-defined surreal number forms;
 The operations can be extended to numbers (equivalence classes of forms): the result of negating x or adding or multiplying x and y will represent the same number regardless of the choice of form of x and y; and
 These operations obey the associativity, commutativity, additive inverse, and distributivity axioms in the definition of a field, with additive identity 0 = { | } and multiplicative identity 1 = { 0 | }.

With these rules one can now verify that the numbers found in the first few generations were properly labeled.  The construction rule is repeated to obtain more generations of surreals:

 S0 = { 0 }
 S1 = { −1 < 0 < 1 }
 S2 = { −2 < −1 < − < 0 <  < 1 < 2}
 S3 = { −3 < −2 < − < −1 < − < − < − < 0 <  <  <  < 1 <  < 2 < 3 }
 S4 = { −4 < −3 < ... < − < 0 <  <  <  <  <  <  <  < 1 <  <  <  < 2 <  < 3 < 4 }

Arithmetic closure

For each natural number (finite ordinal) n, all numbers generated in Sn are dyadic fractions, i.e., can be written as an irreducible fraction , where a and b are integers and 0 ≤ b < n.

The set of all surreal numbers that are generated in some Sn for finite n may be denoted as S∗ = .  One may form the three classes

of which S∗ is the union.  No individual Sn is closed under addition and multiplication (except S0), but S∗ is; it is the subring of the rationals consisting of all dyadic fractions.

There are infinite ordinal numbers β for which the set of surreal numbers with birthday less than β is closed under the different arithmetic operations. For any ordinal α, the set of surreal numbers with birthday less than β = ωα (using powers of ω) is closed under addition and forms a group; for birthday less than ωωα it is closed under multiplication and forms a ring; and for birthday less than an (ordinal) epsilon number εα it is closed under multiplicative inverse and forms a field. The latter sets are also closed under the exponential function as defined by Kruskal and Gonshor.

However, it is always possible to construct a surreal number that is greater than any member of a set of surreals (by including the set on the left side of the constructor) and thus the collection of surreal numbers is a proper class. With their ordering and algebraic operations they constitute an ordered field, with the caveat that they do not form a set. In fact it is the biggest ordered field, in that every ordered field is a subfield of the surreal numbers. The class of all surreal numbers is denoted by the symbol .

Infinity 

Define Sω as the set of all surreal numbers generated by the construction rule from subsets of S∗.  (This is the same inductive step as before, since the ordinal number ω is the smallest ordinal that is larger than all natural numbers; however, the set union appearing in the inductive step is now an infinite union of finite sets, and so this step can only be performed in a set theory that allows such a union.)  A unique infinitely large positive number occurs in Sω:
 
Sω also contains objects that can be identified as the rational numbers.  For example, the ω-complete form of the fraction  is given by:
 .

Not only do all the rest of the rational numbers appear in Sω; the remaining finite real numbers do too.  For example,
 .

The only infinities in Sω are ω and −ω; but there are other non-real numbers in Sω among the reals.  Consider the smallest positive number in Sω:
 .
This number is larger than zero but less than all positive dyadic fractions. It is therefore an infinitesimal number, often labeled ε.  The ω-complete form of ε (respectively -ε) is the same as the ω-complete form of 0, except that 0 is included in the left (respectively right) set.  The only "pure" infinitesimals in Sω are ε and its additive inverse -ε; adding them to any dyadic fraction y produces the numbers y ± ε, which also lie in Sω.

One can determine the relationship between ω and ε by multiplying particular forms of them to obtain:
 ω · ε = { ε · S+ | ω · S+ + S∗ + ε · S∗ }.
This expression is only well-defined in a set theory which permits transfinite induction up to Sω2.  In such a system, one can demonstrate that all the elements of the left set of ωSω·Sωε are positive infinitesimals and all the elements of the right set are positive infinities, and therefore ωSω·Sωε is the oldest positive finite number, 1.  Consequently,  = ω. Some authors systematically use ω−1 in place of the symbol ε.

Contents of Sω

Given any x = { L | R } in Sω, exactly one of the following is true:
 L and R are both empty, in which case x = 0;
 R is empty and some integer n≥0 is greater than every element of L, in which case x equals the smallest such integer n;
 R is empty and no integer n is greater than every element of L, in which case x equals +ω;
 L is empty and some integer n≤0 is less than every element of R, in which case x equals the largest such integer n;
 L is empty and no integer n is less than every element of R, in which case x equals −ω;
 L and R are both non-empty, and:
 Some dyadic fraction y is "strictly between" L and R (greater than all elements of L and less than all elements of R), in which case x equals the oldest such dyadic fraction y;
 No dyadic fraction y lies strictly between L and R, but some dyadic fraction  is greater than or equal to all elements of L and less than all elements of R, in which case x equals y + ε;
 No dyadic fraction y lies strictly between L and R, but some dyadic fraction  is greater than all elements of L and less than or equal to all elements of R, in which case x equals y − ε;
 Every dyadic fraction is either greater than some element of R or less than some element of L, in which case x is some real number that has no representation as a dyadic fraction.

Sω is not an algebraic field, because it is not closed under arithmetic operations; consider ω+1, whose form

does not lie in any number in Sω.  The maximal subset of Sω that is closed under (finite series of) arithmetic operations is the field of real numbers, obtained by leaving out the infinities ±ω, the infinitesimals ±ε, and the infinitesimal neighbors y ± ε of each nonzero dyadic fraction y.

This construction of the real numbers differs from the Dedekind cuts of standard analysis in that it starts from dyadic fractions rather than general rationals and naturally identifies each dyadic fraction in Sω with its forms in previous generations.  (The ω-complete forms of real elements of Sω are in one-to-one correspondence with the reals obtained by Dedekind cuts, under the proviso that Dedekind reals corresponding to rational numbers are represented by the form in which the cut point is omitted from both left and right sets.)  The rationals are not an identifiable stage in the surreal construction; they are merely the subset Q of Sω containing all elements x such that x b = a for some a and some nonzero b, both drawn from S∗.  By demonstrating that Q is closed under individual repetitions of the surreal arithmetic operations, one can show that it is a field; and by showing that every element of Q is reachable from S∗ by a finite series (no longer than two, actually) of arithmetic operations including multiplicative inversion, one can show that Q is strictly smaller than the subset of Sω identified with the reals.

The set Sω has the same cardinality as the real numbers R.  This can be demonstrated by exhibiting surjective mappings from Sω to the closed unit interval I of R and vice versa.  Mapping Sω onto I is routine; map numbers less than or equal to ε (including −ω) to 0, numbers greater than or equal to 1 − ε (including ω) to 1, and numbers between ε and 1 − ε to their equivalent in I (mapping the infinitesimal neighbors y±ε of each dyadic fraction y, along with y itself, to y).  To map I onto Sω, map the (open) central third of I onto { | } = 0; the central third of the upper third to { 0 | } = 1; and so forth.  This maps a nonempty open interval of I onto each element of S∗, monotonically.  The residue of I consists of the Cantor set 2ω, each point of which is uniquely identified by a partition of the central-third intervals into left and right sets, corresponding precisely to a form  in Sω.  This places the Cantor set in one-to-one correspondence with the set of surreal numbers with birthday ω.

Transfinite induction 

Continuing to perform transfinite induction beyond Sω produces more ordinal numbers α, each represented as the largest surreal number having birthday α.  (This is essentially a definition of the ordinal numbers resulting from transfinite induction.)  The first such ordinal is ω+1 = { ω | }.  There is another positive infinite number in generation ω+1:
 ω − 1 = { 1, 2, 3, 4, ... | ω }.
The surreal number ω − 1 is not an ordinal; the ordinal ω is not the successor of any ordinal. Similarly, there are two new infinitesimal numbers in generation ω + 1:
 2ε = ε + ε = { ε | 1 + ε,  + ε,  + ε,  + ε, ... } and
  = ε ·  = { 0 | ε }.

At a later stage of transfinite induction, there is a number larger than ω + k for all natural numbers k:
 2ω = ω + ω = { ω+1, ω+2, ω+3, ω+4, ... | }
It is the second limit ordinal; reaching it from ω via the construction step requires a transfinite induction on

This involves an infinite union of infinite sets, which is a "stronger" set theoretic operation than the previous transfinite induction required.

Note that the conventional addition and multiplication of ordinals does not always coincide with these operations on their surreal representations.  The sum of ordinals 1 + ω equals ω, but the surreal sum is commutative and produces 1 + ω = ω + 1 > ω.  The addition and multiplication of the surreal numbers associated with ordinals coincides with the natural sum and natural product of ordinals.

Just as 2ω is bigger than ω + n for any natural number n, there is a surreal number  that is infinite but smaller than ω − n for any natural number n.  That is,  is defined by
  = { S∗ | ω − S∗ }
where on the right hand side the notation x − Y is used to mean .

Powers of ω and the Conway normal form 

To classify the "orders" of infinite and infinitesimal surreal numbers, also known as archimedean classes, Conway associated to each surreal number x the surreal number
 ωx = { 0, r ωxL | s ωxR },
where r and s range over the positive real numbers.  If x < y then ωy is "infinitely greater" than ωx, in that it is greater than r ωx for all real numbers r.  Powers of ω also satisfy the conditions
 ωx ωy = ωx+y,
 ω−x = ,
so they behave the way one would expect powers to behave.

Each power of ω also has the redeeming feature of being the simplest surreal number in its archimedean class; conversely, every archimedean class within the surreal numbers contains a unique simplest member.  Thus, for every positive surreal number x there will always exist some positive real number r and some surreal number y so that x − rωy is "infinitely smaller" than x.  The exponent y is the "base ω logarithm" of x, defined on the positive surreals; it can be demonstrated that logω maps the positive surreals onto the surreals and that
logω(xy) = logω(x) + logω(y).

This gets extended by transfinite induction so that every surreal number has a "normal form" analogous to the Cantor normal form for ordinal numbers.  This is the Conway normal form: Every surreal number x may be uniquely written as
 x = r0ωy0 + r1ωy1 + ...,
where every rα is a nonzero real number and the yαs form a strictly decreasing sequence of surreal numbers.  This "sum", however, may have infinitely many terms, and in general has the length of an arbitrary ordinal number. (Zero corresponds of course to the case of an empty sequence, and is the only surreal number with no leading exponent.)

Looked at in this manner, the surreal numbers resemble a power series field, except that the decreasing sequences of exponents must be bounded in length by an ordinal and are not allowed to be as long as the class of ordinals. This is the basis for the formulation of the surreal numbers as a Hahn series.

Gaps and continuity

In contrast to the real numbers, a (proper) subset of the surreal numbers does not have a least upper (or lower) bound unless it has a maximal (minimal) element. Conway defines a gap as { L | R } such that every element of L is less than every element of R, and L ∪ R = ; this is not a number because at least one of the sides is a proper class. Though similar, gaps are not quite the same as Dedekind cuts, but we can still talk about a completion  of the surreal numbers with the natural ordering which is a (proper class-sized) linear continuum.

For instance there is no least positive infinite surreal, but the gap
∞ = {x: ∃ n ∈ : x < n | x: ∀ n ∈ : x > n}
Similarly the gap  = {  | } is larger than all surreal numbers. (This is an esoteric pun: In the general construction of ordinals, α "is" the set of ordinals smaller than α, and we can use this equivalence to write  in the surreals;  denotes the class of ordinal numbers, and because  is cofinal in  we have  by extension.)

With a bit of set-theoretic care,  can be equipped with a topology where the open sets are unions of open intervals (indexed by proper sets) and continuous functions can be defined. An equivalent of Cauchy sequences can be defined as well, although they have to be indexed by the class of ordinals; these will always converge, but the limit may be either a number or a gap that can be expressed as

(All such gaps can be understood as Cauchy sequences themselves, but there are other types of gap that are not limits, such as ∞ and ).

Exponential function
Based on unpublished work by Kruskal, a construction (by transfinite induction) that extends the real exponential function exp(x) (with base e) to the surreals was carried through by Gonshor.

Other exponentials
The powers of ω function is also an exponential function, but does not have the properties desired for an extension of the function on the reals. It will, however, be needed in the development of the base-e exponential, and it is this function that is meant whenever the notation ωx is used in the following.

When y is a dyadic fraction, the power function ,  may be composed from multiplication, multiplicative inverse and square root, all of which can be defined inductively. Its values are completely determined by the basic relation , and where defined it necessarily agrees with any other exponentiation that can exist.

Basic induction
The induction steps for the surreal exponential are based on the series expansion for the real exponential,

more specifically those partial sums that can be shown by basic algebra to be positive but less than all later ones. For x positive these are denoted [x]n and include all partial sums; for x negative but finite, [x]2n+1 denotes the odd steps in the series starting from the first one with a positive real part (which always exists). For x negative infinite the odd-numbered partial sums are strictly decreasing and the [x]2n+1 notation denotes the empty set, but it turns out that the corresponding elements are not needed in the induction.

The relations that hold for real  are then

and

and this can be extended to the surreals with the definition 
 
This is well-defined for all surreal arguments (the value exists and does not depend on the choice of zL and zR).

Results
Using this definition, the following holds:
 exp is a strictly increasing positive function, 
 exp satisfies 
 exp is a surjection (onto ) and has a well-defined inverse, 
 exp coincides with the usual exponential function on the reals (and thus )
 For x infinitesimal, the value of the formal power series (Taylor expansion) of exp is well defined and coincides with the inductive definition
 When x is given in Conway normal form, the set of exponents in the result is well-ordered and the coefficients are finite sums, directly giving the normal form of the result (which has a leading 1)
 Similarly, for x infinitesimally close to 1, log x is given by power series expansion of 
 For positive infinite x, exp x is infinite as well
 If x has the form ωα (α > 0), exp x has the form ωωβ where β is a strictly increasing function of α. In fact there is an inductively defined bijection  whose inverse can also be defined inductively
 If x is "pure infinite" with normal form  where all , then 
 Any surreal number can be written as the sum of a pure infinite, a real and an infinitesimal part, and the exponential is the product of the partial results given above
 The normal form can be written out by multiplying the infinite part (a single power of ω) and the real exponential into the power series resulting from the infinitesimal
 While there is no general inductive definition of log (unlike for exp), the partial results are given in terms of such definitions. In this way, the logarithm can be calculated explicitly, without reference to the fact that it's the inverse of the exponential.
 The exponential function is much greater than any finite power
 For any positive infinite x and any finite n, exp(x)/xn is infinite
 For any integer n and surreal x > n2, exp(x) > xn. This stronger constraint is one of the Ressayre axioms for the real exponential field
 exp satisfies all the Ressayre axioms for the real exponential field
 The surreals with exponential is an elementary extension of the real exponential field
 For εβ an ordinal epsilon number, the set of surreal numbers with birthday less than εβ constitute a field that is closed under exponentials, and is likewise an elementary extension of the real exponential field

Examples
The surreal exponential is essentially given by its behaviour on positive powers of ω, i.e., the function g(a), combined with well-known behaviour on finite numbers. Only examples of the former will be given. In addition,  holds for a large part of its range, for instance for any finite number with positive real part and any infinite number that is less than some iterated power of ω ( for some number of levels).
 exp ω = ωω
 exp ω1/ω = ω and log ω = ω1/ω
 exp (ω · log ω) = exp (ω · ω1/ω) = ωω(1 + 1/ω)
 This shows that the "power of ω" function is not compatible with exp, since compatibility would demand a value of ωω here
 exp ε0 = ωωε0 + 1
 log ε0 =  ε0 / ω

Exponentiation
Again it is essential to distinguish this definition from the "powers of ω" function, especially if ω may occur as the base.

Surcomplex numbers 

The surcomplex numbers form an algebraically closed field (except for being a proper class), isomorphic to the algebraic closure of the field generated by extending the rational numbers by a proper class of algebraically independent transcendental elements. Up to field isomorphism, this fact characterizes the field of surcomplex numbers within any fixed set theory.

Games

The definition of surreal numbers contained one restriction: each element of L must be strictly less than each element of R.  If this restriction is dropped we can generate a more general class known as games.  All games are constructed according to this rule:

 Construction rule  If L and R are two sets of games then { L | R } is a game.

Addition, negation, and comparison are all defined the same way for both surreal numbers and games.

Every surreal number is a game, but not all games are surreal numbers, e.g. the game { 0 | 0 } is not a surreal number.  The class of games is more general than the surreals, and has a simpler definition, but lacks some of the nicer properties of surreal numbers.  The class of surreal numbers forms a field, but the class of games does not.  The surreals have a total order: given any two surreals, they are either equal, or one is greater than the other.  The games have only a partial order: there exist pairs of games that are neither equal, greater than, nor less than each other.  Each surreal number is either positive, negative, or zero.  Each game is either positive, negative, zero, or fuzzy (incomparable with zero, such as {1|−1}).

A move in a game involves the player whose move it is choosing a game from those available in L (for the left player) or R (for the right player) and then passing this chosen game to the other player.  A player who cannot move because the choice is from the empty set has lost. A positive game represents a win for the left player, a negative game for the right player, a zero game for the second player to move, and a fuzzy game for the first player to move.

If x, y, and z are surreals, and x=y, then x z=y z.  However, if x, y, and z are games, and x=y, then it is not always true that x z=y z.  Note that "=" here means equality, not identity.

Application to combinatorial game theory

The surreal numbers were originally motivated by studies of the game Go, and there are numerous connections between popular games and the surreals.  In this section, we will use a capitalized Game for the mathematical object {L|R}, and the lowercase game for recreational games like Chess or Go.

We consider games with these properties:
 Two players (named Left and Right)
 Deterministic (the game at each step will completely depend on the choices the players make, rather than a random factor)
 No hidden information (such as cards or tiles that a player hides)
 Players alternate taking turns (the game may or may not allow multiple moves in a turn)
 Every game must end in a finite number of moves
 As soon as there are no legal moves left for a player, the game ends, and that player loses

For most games, the initial board position gives no great advantage to either player.  As the game progresses and one player starts to win, board positions will occur in which that player has a clear advantage.  For analyzing games, it is useful to associate a Game with every board position.  The value of a given position will be the Game {L|R}, where L is the set of values of all the positions that can be reached in a single move by Left. Similarly, R is the set of values of all the positions that can be reached in a single move by Right.

The zero Game (called 0) is the Game where L and R are both empty, so the player to move next (L or R) immediately loses. The sum of two Games G = { L1 | R1 } and H = { L2 | R2 } is defined as the Game G + H = { L1 + H, G + L2 | R1 + H, G + R2 } where the player to move chooses which of the Games to play in at each stage, and the loser is still the player who ends up with no legal move. One can imagine two chess boards between two players, with players making moves alternately, but with complete freedom as to which board to play on. If G is the Game {L | R}, -G is the Game {-R | -L}, i.e. with the role of the two players reversed. It is easy to show G - G = 0 for all Games G (where G -  H is defined as G + (-H)).

This simple way to associate Games with games yields a very interesting result.  Suppose two perfect players play a game starting with a given position whose associated Game is x.  We can classify all Games into four classes as follows:

 If x > 0 then Left will win, regardless of who plays first.
 If x < 0 then Right will win, regardless of who plays first.
 If x = 0 then the player who goes second will win.
 If x || 0 then the player who goes first will win.

More generally, we can define G > H as G - H > 0, and similarly for <, = and ||.

The notation G || H means that G and H are incomparable.  G || H is equivalent to G−H || 0, i.e. that G > H, G < H and G = H are all false. Incomparable games are sometimes said to be confused with each other, because one or the other may be preferred by a player depending on what is added to it.  A game confused with zero is said to be fuzzy, as opposed to positive, negative, or zero. An example of a fuzzy game is star (*).

Sometimes when a game nears the end, it will decompose into several smaller games that do not interact, except in that each player's turn allows moving in only one of them.  For example, in Go, the board will slowly fill up with pieces until there are just a few small islands of empty space where a player can move.  Each island is like a separate game of Go, played on a very small board.  It would be useful if each subgame could be analyzed separately, and then the results combined to give an analysis of the entire game.  This doesn't appear to be easy to do.  For example, there might be two subgames where whoever moves first wins, but when they are combined into one big game, it is no longer the first player who wins.  Fortunately, there is a way to do this analysis.  The following theorem can be applied:

If a big game decomposes into two smaller games, and the small games have associated Games of x and y, then the big game will have an associated Game of x+y.

A game composed of smaller games is called the disjunctive sum of those smaller games, and the theorem states that the method of addition we defined is equivalent to taking the disjunctive sum of the addends.

Historically, Conway developed the theory of surreal numbers in the reverse order of how it has been presented here.  He was analyzing Go endgames, and realized that it would be useful to have some way to combine the analyses of non-interacting subgames into an analysis of their disjunctive sum.  From this he invented the concept of a Game and the addition operator for it.  From there he moved on to developing a definition of negation and comparison.  Then he noticed that a certain class of Games had interesting properties; this class became the surreal numbers.  Finally, he developed the multiplication operator, and proved that the surreals are actually a field, and that it includes both the reals and ordinals.

Alternative realizations

Alternative approaches to the surreal numbers complement Conway's exposition in terms of games.

Sign expansion

Definitions

In what is now called the sign-expansion or sign-sequence of a surreal number, a surreal number is a function whose domain is an ordinal and whose codomain is { −1, +1 }. This is equivalent to Conway's L-R sequences.

Define the binary predicate "simpler than" on numbers by x is simpler than y if x is a proper subset of y, i.e. if dom(x) < dom(y) and x(α) = y(α) for all α < dom(x).

For surreal numbers define the binary relation < to be lexicographic order (with the convention that "undefined values" are greater than −1 and less than 1). So x < y if one of the following holds:
 x is simpler than y and y(dom(x)) = + 1;
 y is simpler than x and x(dom(y)) = − 1;
 there exists a number z such that z is simpler than x, z is simpler than y, x(dom(z)) = − 1 and y(dom(z)) = + 1.

Equivalently, let δ(x,y) = min({ dom(x), dom(y)} ∪ { α :
α < dom(x) ∧ α < dom(y) ∧ x(α) ≠ y(α) }),
so that x = y if and only if δ(x,y) = dom(x) = dom(y).  Then, for numbers x and y, x < y if and only if one of the following holds:
 δ(x,y) = dom(x) ∧ δ(x,y) < dom(y) ∧ y(δ(x,y)) = + 1;
 δ(x,y) < dom(x) ∧ δ(x,y) = dom(y) ∧ x(δ(x,y)) = − 1;
 δ(x,y) < dom(x) ∧ δ(x,y) < dom(y) ∧ x(δ(x,y)) = − 1 ∧ y(δ(x,y)) = + 1.

For numbers x and y, x ≤ y if and only if x < y ∨ x = y, and x > y if and only if y < x. Also x ≥ y if and only if y ≤ x.

The relation < is transitive, and for all numbers x and y, exactly one of x < y, x = y, x > y, holds (law of trichotomy).  This means that < is a linear order (except that < is a proper class).

For sets of numbers, L and R such that ∀x ∈ L ∀y ∈ R (x < y), there exists a unique number z such that
 ∀x ∈ L (x < z) ∧ ∀y ∈ R (z < y),
 For any number w such that ∀x ∈ L (x < w) ∧ ∀y ∈ R (w < y), w = z or z is simpler than w.

Furthermore, z is constructible from L and R by transfinite induction.  z is the simplest number between L and R.  Let the unique number z be denoted by σ(L,R).

For a number x, define its left set L(x) and right set R(x) by
 L(x) = { x|α : α < dom(x) ∧ x(α) = + 1 };
 R(x) = { x|α : α < dom(x) ∧ x(α) = − 1 },

then σ(L(x),R(x)) = x.

One advantage of this alternative realization is that equality is identity, not an inductively defined relation. Unlike Conway's realization of the surreal numbers, however, the sign-expansion requires a prior construction of the ordinals, while in Conway's realization, the ordinals are constructed as particular cases of surreals.

However, similar definitions can be made that eliminate the need for prior construction of the ordinals.  For instance, we could let the surreals be the (recursively-defined) class of functions whose domain is a subset of the surreals satisfying the transitivity rule ∀g ∈ dom f  (∀h ∈ dom g (h ∈ dom f )) and whose range is { −, + }.  "Simpler than" is very simply defined now—x is simpler than y  if x ∈ dom y.  The total ordering is defined by considering x and y as sets of ordered pairs (as a function is normally defined):  Either x = y,  or else the surreal number z = x ∩ y  is in the domain of x  or the domain of y  (or both, but in this case the signs must disagree).  We then have x < y  if x(z) = − or y(z) = + (or both).  Converting these functions into sign sequences is a straightforward task; arrange the elements of dom f  in order of simplicity (i.e., inclusion), and then write down the signs that f assigns to each of these elements in order.  The ordinals then occur naturally as those surreal numbers whose range is { + }.

Addition and multiplication

The sum x + y of two numbers, x and y, is defined by induction on dom(x) and dom(y) by x + y = σ(L,R), where
 L = { u + y : u ∈ L(x) } ∪{ x + v : v ∈ L(y) },
 R = { u + y : u ∈ R(x) } ∪{ x + v : v ∈ R(y) }.

The additive identity is given by the number 0 = { }, i.e. the number 0 is the unique function whose domain is the ordinal 0, and the additive inverse of the number x is the number − x, given by dom(− x) = dom(x), and, for α < dom(x), (− x)(α) = − 1 if x(α) = + 1, and (− x)(α) = + 1 if x(α) = − 1.

It follows that a number x is positive if and only if 0 < dom(x) and x(0) = + 1, and x is negative if and only if 0 < dom(x) and x(0) = − 1.

The product xy of two numbers, x and y, is defined by induction on dom(x) and dom(y) by xy = σ(L,R), where
 L = { uy + xv − uv : u ∈ L(x), v ∈ L(y) } ∪ { uy + xv − uv : u ∈ R(x), v ∈ R(y) },
 R = { uy + xv − uv : u ∈ L(x), v ∈ R(y) } ∪ { uy + xv − uv : u ∈ R(x), v ∈ L(y) }.

The multiplicative identity is given by the number 1 = { (0,+ 1) }, i.e. the number 1 has domain equal to the ordinal 1, and 1(0) = + 1.

Correspondence with Conway's realization

The map from Conway's realization to sign expansions is given by f({ L | R }) = σ(M,S), where M = { f(x) : x ∈ L } and S = { f(x) : x ∈ R }.

The inverse map from the alternative realization to Conway's realization is given by g(x) = { L | R }, where L = { g(y) : y ∈ L(x) } and R = { g(y) : y ∈ R(x) }.

Axiomatic approach

In another approach to the surreals, given by Alling,  explicit construction is bypassed altogether. Instead, a set of axioms is given that any particular approach to the surreals must satisfy. Much like the axiomatic approach to the reals, these axioms guarantee uniqueness up to isomorphism.

A triple  is a surreal number system if and only if the following hold:

 < is a total order over 
 b is a function from  onto the class of all ordinals (b is called the "birthday function" on ).
 Let A and B be subsets of  such that for all x ∈ A and y ∈ B, x < y (using Alling's terminology, 〈 A,B 〉 is a "Conway cut" of ). Then there exists a unique z ∈  such that b(z) is minimal and for all x ∈ A and all y ∈ B, x < z < y. (This axiom is often referred to as "Conway's Simplicity Theorem".)
 Furthermore, if an ordinal α is greater than b(x) for all x ∈ A, B, then b(z) ≤ α. (Alling calls a system that satisfies this axiom a "full surreal number system".)

Both Conway's original construction and the sign-expansion construction of surreals satisfy these axioms.

Given these axioms, Alling derives Conway's original definition of ≤ and develops surreal arithmetic.

Simplicity hierarchy

A construction of the surreal numbers as a maximal binary pseudo-tree with simplicity (ancestor) and ordering relations is due to Philip Ehrlich, The difference from the usual definition of a tree is that the set of ancestors of a vertex is well-ordered, but may not have a maximal element (immediate predecessor); in other words the order type of that set is a general ordinal number, not just a natural number. This construction fulfills Alling's axioms as well and can easily be mapped to the sign-sequence representation.

Hahn series

Alling also proves that the field of surreal numbers is isomorphic (as an ordered field) to the field of Hahn series with real coefficients on the value group of surreal numbers themselves (the series representation corresponding to the normal form of a surreal number, as defined above).  This provides a connection between surreal numbers and more conventional mathematical approaches to ordered field theory.

This isomorphism makes the surreal numbers into a valued field where the valuation is the additive inverse of the exponent of the leading term in the Conway normal form, e.g., ν(ω) = -1. The valuation ring then consists of the finite surreal numbers (numbers with a real and/or an infinitesimal part). The reason for the sign inversion is that the exponents in the Conway normal form constitute a reverse well-ordered set, whereas Hahn series are formulated in terms of (non-reversed) well-ordered subsets of the value group.

Relation to hyperreals
Philip Ehrlich has constructed an isomorphism between Conway's maximal surreal number field and the maximal hyperreals in von Neumann–Bernays–Gödel set theory.

See also

 Hyperreal number
 Non-standard analysis

Notes

References

Further reading
 Donald Knuth's original exposition: Surreal Numbers: How Two Ex-Students Turned on to Pure Mathematics and Found Total Happiness, 1974, . More information can be found at the book's official homepage.
 An update of the classic 1976 book defining the surreal numbers, and exploring their connections to games: John Conway, On Numbers And Games, 2nd ed., 2001, .
 An update of the first part of the 1981 book that presented surreal numbers and the analysis of games to a broader audience:  Berlekamp, Conway, and Guy, Winning Ways for Your Mathematical Plays, vol. 1, 2nd ed., 2001, .
 Martin Gardner, Penrose Tiles to Trapdoor Ciphers,  W. H. Freeman & Co., 1989, Chapter 4.  A non-technical overview; reprint of the 1976 Scientific American article.
 Polly Shulman, "Infinity Plus One, and Other Surreal Numbers",  Discover, December 1995.
 A detailed treatment of surreal numbers: Norman L. Alling, Foundations of Analysis over Surreal Number Fields, 1987, .
 A treatment of surreals based on the sign-expansion realization: Harry Gonshor, An Introduction to the Theory of Surreal Numbers, 1986, .
 A detailed philosophical development of the concept of surreal numbers as a most general concept of number: Alain Badiou, Number and Numbers,  New York: Polity Press, 2008,  (paperback),  (hardcover).
  The surreal numbers are studied in the context of homotopy type theory in section 11.6.

External links
 Hackenstrings, and the 0.999... ?= 1 FAQ, by A. N. Walker, an archive of the disappeared original
 A gentle yet thorough introduction by Claus Tøndering
 Good Math, Bad Math: Surreal Numbers, a series of articles about surreal numbers and their variations
 Conway's Mathematics after Conway, survey of Conway's accomplishments in the AMS Notices, with a section on surreal numbers

 

Combinatorial game theory
Mathematical logic
Infinity
Real closed field
John Horton Conway
Nonstandard analysis